Richard Bordowski (born 20 June 1982) is a Czech ice hockey centre who is currently playing for the Basingstoke Bison of the National Ice Hockey League. Before this, he played in the Czech Extraliga, mainly for HC Oceláři Třinec. and sometimes on loan to HC Znojemsti Orli. After the 2009–10 Czech Extraliga season, and playing mostly in second and third-tier Czech teams since the 2005-06 season, Bordowski left the Czech leagues and played in Poland. He played for JKH GKS Jastrzębie from the 2011-2016 seasons, and then for Polonia Bytom for the 2017 and half of the 2018 season before returning to JKH GKS Jastrzebie.

References

Czech ice hockey centres
HC Oceláři Třinec players
Orli Znojmo players
JKH GKS Jastrzębie players
TMH Polonia Bytom players
Basingstoke Bison players
1982 births
Living people
Sportspeople from Třinec
HC Olomouc players
Czech expatriate ice hockey people
Czech expatriate sportspeople in England
Czech expatriate sportspeople in Poland
Expatriate ice hockey players in England
Expatriate ice hockey players in Poland